Liu Zhiwei (born December 18, 1981 in Beijing) is a male Chinese sports shooter who competed in the 2004 Summer Olympics.

In 2004, he finished 19th in the men's 50 metre rifle three positions competition.

External links
 profile

1981 births
Living people
Chinese male sport shooters
ISSF rifle shooters
Olympic shooters of China
Sport shooters from Beijing
Shooters at the 2004 Summer Olympics
21st-century Chinese people